Sangla may refer to:

 Sangla, India
 Sangla, Nepal
 Sangla Hill, Pakistan
 Sangla, Estonia, village in Rannu Parish, Tartu County, Estonia